Mycteromyiella is a genus of parasitic flies in the family Tachinidae. There are about five described species in Mycteromyiella.

Species
These five species belong to the genus Mycteromyiella:
 Mycteromyiella marginalis Shima, 1976
 Mycteromyiella obscura Shima, 1976
 Mycteromyiella papuana (Meijere, 1906)
 Mycteromyiella phasmatophaga Crosskey, 1968
 Mycteromyiella tenuiseta Shima, 1976

References

Further reading

 
 
 
 

Tachinidae
Articles created by Qbugbot